Ida Wolden Bache (born 26 February 1973) is a Norwegian economist who has been serving as the governor of Norges Bank, the Norwegian central bank, since 2022. She is also the first woman to hold that position.

Education
Born in Bærum, Bache graduated from Valler Upper Secondary School in 1992, before enrolling into the London School of Economics, where she graduated with a Master of Science degree in 1999. She subsequently went on to complete a PhD at the University of Oslo in 2007.

During her studies, she was a research assistant at the Department of Economics at UiO from 1996 to 1998 and a research assistant at Norges Bank from 1998 to 2000. She was employed as a consultant, adviser and senior adviser at Norges Bank from 2000 to 2009 and held a post-employment position as an associate professor in economics at BI Norwegian Business School from 2008 to 2010.

Career
She was Assistant Director in the Monetary Policy Department at Norges Bank from 2009 to 2010, Senior Economist at Handelsbanken Capital Markets from 2010 to 2013, Assistant Director in the Financial Stability Department at Norges Bank from 2013 to 2015, Department Director in the Financial Stability Department from 2015 to 2016 and Department Director in the Monetary Policy Department of Norges Bank from 2016 to 2020.

Deputy Governor of Norges Bank
She became Deputy Governor in 2020 after her predecessor had lost his security clearance.

During her spring speech in 2021, Bache expressed her doubt that cryptocurrency would replace the Norwegian krone. She notably said that: "If crypto is to replace the krone, the state must also make its payments and collections in a currency other than the krone".

In November, she further expressed her doubts about cryptocurrency, calling it a "threat". She stated: "The prevalence and scope is currently quite modest in Norway, but we point to possible channels through which cryptocurrencies can have effects on the financial system and pose a threat to the financial system in the long run".

Governor of Norges Bank
In December 2021, she applied to become the next governor of the Norwegian central bank, with Jens Stoltenberg and her seen as the most prominent candidates for the post. Controversy was caused when NRK listed only parts of her CV during a broadcast. The state broadcaster later corrected their mistake, then listing the missing parts of her CV.

To begin with, Bache did not get the position, but accepted to become the acting governor in the interim until Stoltenberg had finished his tenure as NATO Secretary-General. However, on 24 March, following a NATO summit about the Russian invasion of Ukraine, Stoltenberg announced that he would continue as NATO Secretary-General for another year and that he would resign as the incoming governor. Bache was then nominated to fill the term that Stoltenberg was meant to take on. She was formally appointed to the position on 1 April at the Council of State.

The same day as her appointment, Bache announced that Norges Bank would raise interest rates, stating: "As we now assess the outlook and the risk picture, the key policy rate will most likely be raised further in June".

References

1973 births
Living people
People from Bærum
Norwegian economists
Norwegian women economists
Governors of the Central Bank of Norway
Alumni of the London School of Economics
University of Oslo alumni
Directors of government agencies of Norway